M. Wendel Smith was an American football coach.  He served as the head football coach at Wheaton College in Wheaton, Illinois for one season, in 1935, compiling a record of 2–5–1.

Head coaching record

References

Year of birth missing
Year of death missing
Wheaton Thunder football coaches